Humanimal was a musical project featuring Pontus Norgren (Great King Rat) and  Marcel Jacob (Talisman).

The band's name idea come from Marcel Jacob who used the following quote: "...we might be human but in the end, we still being animals".

The main idea was to have a hard rock record with three singers: Leif Sundin (Great King Rat, John Norum, Michael Schenker Group), Jeff Scott Soto (Talisman, ex-Yngwie Malmsteen) and Mats Levén (Krux, At Vance, ex-Yngwie Malmsteen).

After some research and testing, they decided to go with one singer, because they also thought it would be easier for the listeners if they only used one, and well they chose Jeff Scott Soto.

After that, again Norgren and Jacob were thinking about who could be the best drummer that they should use for that kind of musical project and they chose Tomas Broman (Great King Rat, Electric Boys, Amaze Me, Hughes Turner Project, Glenn Hughes).

They released their only record on January 28, 2002 in USA and February 1 in Europe, but by popular demand the record label made a second edition to reach at least three European countries.

Also on June 17, 2002, the record label released a 3-track EP called "Find My Way Home".

In May the band played a couple of shows to support it. After some personal, professional and legal problems, Pontus and Marcel had a falling-out and Pontus was out both of Talisman and Humanimal, then on October 19 of that year, Humanimal split.

On June 14, 2019, the "new" record label Sun Hill Production re-released the complete Humanimal album to all digital platforms as well on CD.

Discography
 2002 - Humanimal
 2002 - Find My Way Home EP
 2019 - Humanimal complete version in digipak packaging.

Members
Marcel Jacob - Bass
Jeff Scott Soto - Vocals
Pontus Norgren - Guitars
Tomas Broman - Drums
Jesse Nylander - Organ

Swedish hard rock musical groups